Michael L. Thurmond (born 5 January 1953) is an American author, attorney and politician serving as the chief executive officer of DeKalb County, Georgia. A Democrat, he was previously a representative in the Georgia Assembly.

Thurmond served as the interim superintendent of the DeKalb County School District, the third largest district in the state of Georgia from 2013 to 2015. The district serves nearly 99,000 students with over 13,400 employees. Thurmond was the Democratic Party's nominee for United States Senate in 2010. He was also one of the last Democrats to win statewide in Georgia until 2020, when Joe Biden won the state in the 2020 presidential election.

Prior to becoming DeKalb's Schools Superintendent, Thurmond was an attorney at Butler Wooten Cheeley & Peak LLP, a nationally known civil trial practice that has four times set the record civil jury verdict in the State of Georgia and also obtained for its client the largest collected judgment in U.S. history.

Early life 

Thurmond was raised as a sharecropper's son in Clarke County, Georgia.  He graduated cum laude with a B.A. in Philosophy and Religion from Paine College and later earned a Juris Doctor degree from the University of South Carolina School of Law. He also completed the Political Executives program at the John F. Kennedy School of Government at Harvard University.

Political career 

In 1986, he became the first African-American elected to the Georgia General Assembly from Clarke County since Reconstruction. During his legislative tenure, Thurmond authored major legislation that has provided more than $250 million in tax relief to Georgia's senior citizens and working families.

Following his legislative service, he led the state Division of Family and Children's Services and directed Georgia's historic transition from welfare to work. He created the innovative Work First program, which helped over 90,000 welfare-dependent Georgia families move from dependence into the workforce.

In 1997, Thurmond became a distinguished lecturer at the University of Georgia Carl Vinson Institute of Government. The following year in November, he was elected Georgia Labor Commissioner, becoming the first non-incumbent African American to be elected to statewide office in Georgia.

During his three terms as commissioner, the Georgia Labor Department underwent a major transformation in customer service and efficiency. His Georgia Works program has earned national praise and bi-partisan support. President Barack Obama based part of the American Jobs Act after the Georgia Works model. Thurmond's most gratifying accomplishment as a public official was the construction of a $20 million school for young people with disabilities at the historic Roosevelt Institute in Warm Springs, Georgia.

In 2016, Thurmond decided to run for the open DeKalb County C.E.O.'s office being vacated by term-limited incumbent Democrat Burrell Ellis. He won overwhelmingly in the Democratic Primary, and went on to win by a significant margin over his Republican opponent in the November 2016 General Election. Thurmond began his four-year term on January 1, 2017.

He is the recipient of two honorary doctorate degrees from Clark Atlanta University and LaGrange College. Thurmond has also served as a motivational speaker to state school board associations in nine Southern states on issues regarding leadership, diversity, and public education advocacy in the 21st century.

He presently serves on the Board of Curators of the Georgia Historical Society.

U.S. Senate campaign
In April 2010, Thurmond announced his intention to run for the United States Senate, challenging incumbent Republican Johnny Isakson. He easily defeated his opponent in the Democratic primary, county employee RJ Hadley, on July 20. He lost the general election to Isakson and was succeeded as Commissioner of Labor by former state representative Mark Butler, a member of the Republican Party.

Publications
Thurmond's book, Freedom: Georgia's Antislavery Heritage, 1733-1865, was awarded the Georgia Historical Society's Lilla Hawes Award. The Georgia Center for the Book listed Freedom on its 2005 list of The 25 Books All Georgians Should Read.

Personal life
He is married to Zola Fletcher Thurmond, and they have one daughter, Mikaya Thurmond.

Notes

References
 Michael L. Thurmond – Superintendent, DeKalb County School District
The History Makers
About the Department of Labor

|-

1953 births
African-American state legislators in Georgia (U.S. state)
Living people
State labor commissioners in the United States
Democratic Party members of the Georgia House of Representatives
Paine College alumni
University of South Carolina School of Law alumni
21st-century African-American people
20th-century African-American people